Dave's Picks Volume 28 is a three-CD live album by the rock band the Grateful Dead. It contains the complete concert recorded on June 17, 1976, at Capitol Theatre, in Passaic, New Jersey and two bonus tracks from June 23, 1976 and June 28, 1976. It was produced as a limited edition of 18,000 copies, and released on October 26, 2018.

Critical reception
On AllMusic, Timothy Monger wrote, "The three-disc set is loaded with highlights of their mid-'70s era, including strong "Help on the Way" / "Slipknot!" / "Franklin's Tower" and "Let It Grow" / "Wharf Rat" / "Around and Around" medleys."

Track listing
Disc 1
First set:
 "Cold Rain and Snow" (traditional, arranged by Grateful Dead) – 7:17
 "Big River" (Johnny Cash) – 6:43
 "They Love Each Other" (Jerry Garcia, Robert Hunter) – 7:37
 "Cassidy" (Bob Weir, John Perry Barlow) – 4:55
 "Tennessee Jed" (Garcia, Hunter) – 10:08 
 "Looks Like Rain" > (Weir, Barlow) – 8:34
 "Row Jimmy" (Garcia, Hunter) – 10:12
 "The Music Never Stopped" (Weir, Barlow) – 6:29
 "Scarlet Begonias" (Garcia, Hunter) – 11:06
 "Promised Land" (Chuck Berry) – 3:59
Disc 2
Second set:
 "Help on the Way" > (Garcia, Hunter) – 5:35
 "Slipknot!" > (Garcia, Keith Godchaux, Bill Kreutzmann, Phil Lesh, Weir) – 8:02
 "Franklin's Tower" (Hunter, Garcia, Kreutzmann) – 11:10
 "Dancing in the Street" ( William "Mickey" Stevenson, Marvin Gaye, Ivy Jo Hunter) – 11:47
 "Samson and Delilah" (traditional, arranged by Grateful Dead) – 6:17
 "Ship Of Fools" (Garcia, Hunter) – 7:41
Disc 3
 "Lazy Lightning" (Weir, Barlow) – 3:02
 "Supplication" (Weir, Barlow) – 5:15
 "Friend of the Devil" (Garcia, Hunter) – 8:54
 "Let It Grow" (Weir, Barlow) – 6:12
 "Drums" (Mickey Hart, Kreutzmann) – 2:38
 "Let It Grow" (Weir, Barlow) – 2:31
 "Wharf Rat" (Garcia, Hunter) – 11:20
 "Around and Around" (Berry) – 7:22
June 23, 1976 – Tower Theatre, Upper Darby, Pennsylvania:
 "Sugaree" (Garcia, Hunter) – 9:09
June 28, 1976 – Auditorium Theatre, Chicago, Illinois:
 "High Time" (Garcia, Hunter) – 9:17 (previously released on Grateful Dead Download Series Volume 4)

Personnel 
Grateful Dead
Jerry Garcia – guitar, vocals
Donna Jean Godchaux – vocals 
Keith Godchaux – keyboards 
Mickey Hart – drums 
Bill Kreutzmann – drums
Phil Lesh – bass
Bob Weir – guitar, vocals
Production
Produced by Grateful Dead
Produced for release by David Lemieux
Associate Producers: Doran Tyson & Ivette Ramos
Mastering: Jeffrey Norman
Recording: Betty Cantor-Jackson
Art direction, design: Steve Vance
Cover art: Tim McDonagh
Liner notes: David Lemieux
Tapes provided through the assistance of ABCD Enterprises, LLC

Charts

References

28
Rhino Records live albums
2018 live albums